Larry Gordon was an American football player.

Larry Gordon may also refer to:

Larry Gordon (basketball)
Larry Gordon (ice hockey)
Larry Gordon (musician) (1945-2021), American musician
Larry Darnell Gordon, perpetrator of the St. Joseph courthouse shooting

See also
Lawrence Gordon (disambiguation)